True North is the eleventh studio album by Norwegian band A-ha. It was released on 21 October 2022 by RCA and Sony Music. The album's opening track "I'm In" was released as the first single on 8 July 2022.

True North is accompanied by a film with the same title featuring a-ha recording the album during November 2021 in Bodø, Norway. Paul Waaktaar-Savoy has said of the project: "First, we had the idea to record a studio session live. Then, to film a studio session. That grew into more of a production with the Norwegian orchestra, the Arctic Philharmonic, who we have collaborated with."

Background and recording
A documentary titled a-ha: The Movie was released in 2021 and tells the story of the band and deals with both their success and the problems, such as personal rifts between members.

In January 2022, it was announced that a-ha had signed a recording contract with Sony Music imprint RCA Records in Germany to release the True North album. The concept of recording an album and an accompanying film was inspired by Bruce Springsteen's Western Stars (2019). Furuholmen wanted to create a Norwegian version of Western Stars and has called the project a "musical letter from our home country" and described the album's themes as "nature and the environment".

Commercial performance 
The album debuted at number 12 on the UK Albums Chart, selling 5,109 copies in its first week. It is a-ha's 17th top 75 album on the chart.

Reception 

The album has had a positive reception from numerous publications, including Rolling Stone, musicOMH, laut.de, Hymn and Retropop.

Track listing

Personnel

a-ha
 Morten Harket – lead vocals (1–12)
 Magne Furuholmen – keyboards (1, 4, 5, 8, 11), piano (1–6, 11), synth (9), acoustic guitar (1, 4, 7, 8, 10–12), backing vocals (1, 4, 5, 8, 10, 11), programming (1, 4, 5, 8, 10–11)
 Pål Waaktaar-Savoy – guitars (2, 3, 6, 7, 9, 12), backing vocals (2, 3, 6, 7, 9, 12), acoustic guitars (1, 4, 10, 11), electric guitar (5, 8), keyboards (2, 3, 6, 7, 9, 12)

Additional musicians
 Kjetil Bjerkestrand – keyboards (tracks 1–12)
 Even Ormestad – bass (tracks 1–12)
 Karl Oluf Wennerberg – drums (tracks 1, 3, 4, 5, 7, 8, 11), percussion (tracks 2, 6, 7, 9, 10, 12)
 Per Hillestad – drums (tracks 1, 2, 6, 7, 9, 12), percussion (tracks 3, 4, 8)
 Piero Perrelli – percussion (track 2)
 Thom Hell – backing vocals (tracks 4, 5, 7, 8, 10, 11)
 Erik Ljunggren – programming (track 5)
 Morten Qvenild – piano (tracks 6 and 12)
 Madeleine Ossum – violin (track 8)
 Kjetil Bjerkestrand – orchestral arrangements (tracks 1, 4, 5, 8, 10 and 11)
 Joe Mardin – orchestral arrangements (tracks 2, 3, 6, 7, 9 and 12)
 Brynjar Lien Schulerud – concertmaster: Norwegian Arctic Philharmonic Orchestra
 Anders Eljas – conductor Svømmehallen
 Lars Erik Gudim – conductor Store Studio

Charts

Weekly charts

Year-end charts

References

2022 albums
A-ha albums
RCA Records albums
Sony Music albums